André Höflich (born 28 April 1997) is a German snowboarder. He competed in the halfpipe event at the 2022 Winter Olympics.

References

Living people
1997 births
German male snowboarders
Place of birth missing (living people)
Snowboarders at the 2022 Winter Olympics
Olympic snowboarders of Germany
21st-century German people